Tiffany Esposito is an American politician serving as a member of the Florida House of Representatives for the 77th district. She assumed office on November 8, 2022.

Education 
Esposito earned a Bachelor of Arts degree in communication and Master of Business Administration from Florida Gulf Coast University.

Career 
From 2009 to 2014, Esposito worked for SWFL Inc., a chamber of commerce for businesses in the South Florida region. In 2015 and 2016, she was the chief of staff for the Greater Naples Chamber of Commerce. In 2016, she rejoined SWFL Inc. as president and CEO. Esposito was elected to the Florida House of Representatives in November 2022.

References 

Living people
Republican Party members of the Florida House of Representatives
Women state legislators in Florida
Florida Gulf Coast University alumni
21st-century American politicians
21st-century American women politicians
1987 births
Hispanic and Latino American state legislators in Florida
American politicians of Cuban descent